The Gstellihorn (2,855 m) is a mountain of the Bernese Alps, located west of Innertkirchen in the Bernese Oberland. It is the highest summit of the Engelhörner, the chain between the Reichenbachtal and the Urbachtal.

References

External links

 Gstellihorn on Hikr

Bernese Alps
Mountains of the Alps
Mountains of Switzerland
Oberhasli
Mountains of the canton of Bern
Two-thousanders of Switzerland